The 2011–12 Ukrainian Premier League season was the 21st since its establishment and fourth since its reorganisation. The season began on 8 July 2011 when newly promoted PFC Oleksandria visited FC Vorskla Poltava. FC Shakhtar Donetsk were the defending champions, having won their 6th league title in the 2010–11 season and they successfully defended their title by winning the championship in the last round of the competition.

A total of sixteen teams participated in the league, the best fourteen sides of the 2010–11 season and two promoted clubs from the 2010–11 Ukrainian First League.

The competition had a winter break which began on 11 December 2011 and the season resumed on 3 March 2012. The season concluded on 10 May 2012.

Teams

Promoted
PFC Oleksandria, champion of the 2010–11 Ukrainian First League – (returning after absence of 8 seasons)
FC Chornomorets Odesa, runner-up of the 2010–11 Ukrainian First League – (returning after absence of a season)

Location map

Stadiums
The following stadiums were used during the season.

Managers and captains

Notes:
 Mircea Lucescu was injured in a car accident in his native Bucharest on 6 January 2012. Two days later he was operated on because of blood in his chest and broken ribs.

Managerial changes

Qualification to European competitions for 2012–13
 Since Ukraine finished in eighth place of the UEFA country ranking after the 2010–11 season, the league will have the same number of qualifiers for 2012–13 UEFA Europa League. The Ukrainian Cup winner qualifies for the play-off round.

Qualified teams
 After the 22nd Round, Dynamo Kyiv qualified for European football for the 2012–13 season.
 During the 23rd Round, Shakhtar Donetsk qualified for European football for the 2012–13 season.
 During the 25th Round, Metalist Kharkiv qualified for European football for the 2012–13 season.
 After the 27th Round, Dynamo Kyiv and Shakhtar Donetsk qualified for the 2012–13 UEFA Champions League.
 After the 27th Round Metalist Kharkiv qualified for the 2012–13 Europa League Play-off round.
 Before the 29th Round Metalurh Donetsk qualified for the 2012–13 UEFA Europa League after advancing to the 2012 Ukrainian Cup Final.
 After the 29th Round Dnipro Dnipropetrovsk and Arsenal Kyiv qualified for the 2012–13 UEFA Europa League.
 Before the 30th Round Metalurh Donetsk qualified for the 2012–13 Europa League 2nd qualification round.
 After the 30th Round Arsenal Kyiv qualified for the 2012–13 Europa League 3rd qualification round.
 After the 30th Round Dnipro Dnipropetrovsk qualified for the 2012–13 Europa League Play-off round.
 After the 30th Round Dynamo Kyiv qualified for the 2012–13 Champions League 3rd qualification round.
 After the 30th Round Shakhtar Donetsk qualified for the 2012–13 Champions League Group stage.

League table

Round by round

The following table represents the teams position after each round in the competition.

Results

Top goalscorers
 
The competition's top ten goalscorers.

Season awards
The laureates of the 2011–12 UPL season were:
 Best player:  Yevhen Konoplyanka (Dnipro Dnipropetrovsk)
 Best coach:  Mircea Lucescu (Shakhtar Donetsk)
 Best goalkeeper:  Oleksandr Shovkovskyi (Dynamo Kyiv)
 Best arbiter:  Anatoliy Abdula (Kharkiv)
 Best young player:  Roman Bezus (Vorskla Poltava)
 Best goalscorer:  Yevhen Seleznyov (Shakhtar Donetsk)

See also
2011–12 Ukrainian First League
2011–12 Ukrainian Premier League Reserves
2011–12 Ukrainian Second League
2011–12 Ukrainian Cup
2011–12 UEFA Europa League
 List of Ukrainian football transfers winter 2011–12

References

External links
 Goalscorer section 

Ukrainian Premier League seasons
1
Ukr